The Battle of La Motta, also known as the Battle of Schio, Battle of Vicenza or Battle of Creazzo, took place at Schio, in the Italian region of Veneto, Republic of Venice, on 7 October 1513, between the forces of the Republic of Venice and a combined force of Spain and the Holy Roman Empire, and was a significant battle of the War of the League of Cambrai. A Venetian army under Bartolomeo d'Alviano was decisively defeated by the Spanish/Imperial army commanded by  Ramón de Cardona and Fernando d'Ávalos.

Background
The Venetian commander, Bartolomeo d'Alviano, unexpectedly left without French support, retreated into the region of Veneto, pursued closely by the Spanish army under Ramón de Cardona. While the Spanish were unable to capture Padua, they penetrated deep into Venetian territory and in September were in sight of Venice itself. The Spanish Viceroy of Naples, Ramón de Cardona, attempted a bombardment of the city that proved largely ineffective; then, having no ships with which to cross the lagoon, turned back for Lombardy. D'Alviano, having been reinforced by hundreds of soldiers and volunteers from the Venetian nobility, and cannons and other supplies, took the initiative and pursued Cardona's army, with the intention of not allowing the Spaniards out of the region of Veneto.

Battle

The Venetian army commanded by Bartolomeo d'Alviano, finally confronted Cardona's army outside Vicenza, a city in north-eastern Italy, on 7 October 1513. The Spanish and German infantry, composed of 7,000 men, led by Fernando d'Ávalos and Georg von Frundsberg, well positioned and ready for battle, launched a strong charge against the Venetian army, causing thousands of dead and wounded (over 4,500 casualties) in the ranks of the Venetian army. This was a severe blow, forcing the Venetians to flee, and scattering D'Alviano's entire army.

The forces of the two commanders continued to skirmish in the Italy's most North-Eastern region of Friuli-Venezia Giulia for the rest of 1513 and through 1514.

Consequences
Although the Venetians were decisively defeated by the Spaniards, the Holy League failed to follow up on these victories. The death of the King of France, Louis XII, on 1 January 1515, brought Francis I to the throne. Having assumed the title of Duke of Milan at his coronation, Francis immediately moved to reclaim his holdings in Italy. A combined Swiss and Papal force moved north from Milan to block the Alpine passes against him, but Francis avoided the main passes and marched instead through the valley of the Stura. The French vanguard surprised the Milanese cavalry at Villafranca, capturing Prospero Colonna. Meanwhile, Francis and the main body of the French confronted the Swiss at the Battle of Marignano on 13 September.

See also
War of the League of Cambrai
Battle of Marignano
Italian Wars
List of battles of the Italian Wars

Notes

Sources

Norwich, John Julius. A History of Venice. New York: Vintage Books (1989) .
Kamen, Henry. Empire: How Spain Became a World Power 1492–1763. New York: HarperCollins (2003) .
Taylor, Frederick Lewis. The Art of War in Italy 1494–1529. Cambridge University Press, 1921. Westport: Greenwood Press (1973) .
Montgomery, Bernard Law. A History of Warfare. New York: World Publishing Company (1968) .
Guicciardini, Francesco. The History of Italy. Translated by Sydney Alexander. Princeton: Princeton University Press (1984) .
Mallet, Michael and Shaw, Christine. The Italian Wars 1494–1559. Harlow: Pearson Educated Limited (2012) .
Baumann, Reinhard. Georg von Frundsberg. München: Süddeutscher Verlag (1984) .

Conflicts in 1513
1513 in the Republic of Venice
Battles of the War of the League of Cambrai
Battles involving Spain
Battles involving the Republic of Venice
Battles in Veneto